Maxim's Caterers Limited is a Hong Kong based food, beverage and restaurant chain. It is jointly owned by Dairy Farm International Holdings Limited and Hong Kong Caterers Ltd. 

Founded in 1956, the company operates over 1,000 outlets in Hong Kong, China, Cambodia and Vietnam. These include bakeries, fast food shops restaurants and Starbucks coffee shop licences. Maxim's restaurants have been targeted by conservation campaigners concerned with Maxim's previous sale of shark fins, and for controversial comments made by Annie Wu, daughter of one of Maxim's founders, during the 2019–2020 Hong Kong protests.

History
Maxim's was founded by brothers James Wu and S.T. Wu along with a small group of shareholders. The grand opening of the first Maxim's restaurant, located in the basement of Telephone House in Central, took place on 3 December 1956. Initially positioned as a "first-class restaurant and night-club", the arrival of competing international hoteliers in the 1960s prompted the company to focus more on morning tea, lunch, and snacks.

A holding company, Maxim's Caterers Limited, was formed in October 1972 to acquire the Maxim's and Jade Garden restaurant brands. By early 1973, the group operated 15 restaurants.

Longtime company managing director S.T. Wu stepped down in early 2000, and was replaced by his 29-year-old grandson Michael Wu Wei-kuo, who had previously served as chief financial officer.

Brands

In 1998, Maxim's launched a restaurant series named m.a.x. concepts, which managed restaurant brands including MAX, Cellini, Mecca, Thai Basil, eating plus, Mezz, café Landmark, Emporio Armani Caffé, and modern restaurants Kiku and Miso.

In 2004 the company opened the French-Vietnamese restaurant chain Rice Paper. In the same year, Maxim's Fast Food began producing ready meals and appetisers to be sold in 7–11 and Wellcome supermarkets. 

Maxim's bought Genki Sushi in early 2006, and the company introduced the American restaurant chain Lawry's The Prime Rib to Hong Kong the same year. Maxim's and Australian chef Geoff Lindsay opened the restaurant "Pearl on the Peak" in the Peak Tower. The company is the licensee of Ippudo ramen, Shake Shack and The Cheesecake Factory in various territories.

In May 2000, Maxim's partnered with Starbucks Coffee International, Inc. to form Coffee Concepts Ltd., holding licences for both Hong Kong and Macau.

In 2005, Maxim's have rebranded most of its restaurants as MX.

Controversies

Shark fin controversy
Maxim's have been targeted by campaigners regarding the company's support of shark finning. On 10 June 2017 dozens protested at their flagship 'Maxim's Palace' restaurant
for selling threatened and endangered shark species. 50 protestors attended a demonstration at Maxim's branch at The University of Hong Kong on 10 February 2018. On 15 June 2018 protestors directly targeted Maxim's headquarters in a demonstration that also targeted Starbucks' regional licensee being Maxims. Maxim subsequently announced that it would stop serving shark fin in all restaurants from 1 January 2020.

2019–2020 boycott campaign
Maxim's outlets have been the target of boycotts and vandalism during the 2019–2020 Hong Kong protests after Annie Wu, the daughter of Maxim's co-founder James Wu, denounced the pro-democratic movement during an appearance at the United Nations. She has also repeatedly denounced Hong Kong youth, stating that Hong Kong should "give up" on two generations of "lost" youngsters, and claimed that she would "not waste [her] time talking to them, as they have no idea what they are doing". She criticised young Hong Kongers for their alleged anti-China sentiment, which she blamed on a lack of Chinese history education starting from the kindergarten level.

Wu called on the Chinese Foundation Secondary School, which she founded, to fire faculty and expel students who boycotted classes. Her actions, considered as suppression of freedom of speech, aroused the anger of protesters.

Annie Wu holds only 0.33 per cent of the shares of Hong Kong Caterers Ltd which owns 50 per cent of Maxim's Caterers Ltd, and has no managerial responsibilities in the company. However, it was revealed by David Webb that Annie Wu received HK$1.3 million in dividend payouts for the 2018 fiscal year.

2021–2022 animal cruelty campaign
Maxim's Group has been targeted by a campaign claiming they use animal cruelty in their supply chain across Asia  This campaign claims Maxim's Group uses eggs from battery cages that are banned by the European Union Council Directive 1999/74/EC. The target restaurant chains for this campaign have been so far Genki Sushi and Arome Bakery.

References

External links

Maxim's official website (Chinese)
Maxim's official website (English)

1956 establishments in Hong Kong
2019–2020 Hong Kong protests
Bakeries of Hong Kong
DFI Retail Group
Hong Kong brands
Catering and food service companies of Hong Kong
Fast-food chains of Hong Kong
Chinese restaurants
Restaurants established in 1956
Restaurant chains in Hong Kong
Cantonese cuisine
Cantonese restaurants